Commander Maria Hill is a character appearing in American comic books published by Marvel Comics. Created by Brian Michael Bendis and David Finch, the character first appeared in The New Avengers #4 (March 2005). As a former Director of S.H.I.E.L.D., she appears in various storylines which often feature the Avengers or members of that group.

Cobie Smulders portrays Maria Hill in the Marvel Cinematic Universe (MCU), appearing in the films The Avengers (2012), Captain America: The Winter Soldier (2014), Avengers: Age of Ultron (2015), Avengers: Infinity War (2018), and Avengers: Endgame (2019). Additionally, Smulders appears as Hill in the television series Agents of S.H.I.E.L.D., Spider-Man: Far From Home (2019), voices alternate timeline versions of Hill in the Disney+ animated series What If...? (2021), and will star as the character in the television series Secret Invasion (2023).

Publication history 
Maria Hill first appeared in The New Avengers #4 (March 2005), and was created by Brian Michael Bendis and David Finch.

Joe Quesada, who was Marvel's editor-in-chief during her first appearance, describes the character thus: "[Hill] is such a strong personality, she's like a force of nature and quite frankly, while perhaps not immediately loved by all involved, she's certainly as strong and imposing a figure as Nick Fury. Right now I feel that people view her as the outsider but [while] I don't think she's any harsher than Fury has ever been, what's different is that we aren't quite clear about her motives."

She appeared as a supporting character in the 2010–2013 Avengers series, from issue #1 (July 2010) through its final issue, #34 (January 2013), but only appeared sporadically after the first half of its run.

In 2014, she was a regular character in Black Widow and Secret Avengers.

Fictional character biography

Introduction 
Hill, who was born in Chicago, joins the United States armed forces and later becomes an agent of S.H.I.E.L.D. After Nick Fury's removal as Director of S.H.I.E.L.D. due to the fallout of unauthorized strike on Latveria, Hill is made director of S.H.I.E.L.D.

The Avengers suspect Hill of being complicit in various crimes, but lack evidence to prove it. At the same time, Hill suspects the latest incarnation of the Avengers are harboring an illicit agenda in connection with the "House of M" affair. She abducts Spider-Man and the Vision to question the two about the situation. She earns Iron Man's respect when she ignores the President of the United States's orders to nuke an island while the Avengers are on it.

"Civil War" 
In the 2006–2007 storyline "Civil War", Captain America refuses to assist Commander Hill in preparations to arrest any superheroes who refuse to comply with the Superhuman Registration Act, seeing such activity as politically motivated, but Hill, arguing that Captain America must obey the will of the American people, attempts to arrest Steve Rogers to which Captain America fights out of the Helicarrier and escapes. After the Superhuman Registration Act passes into law, Hill is one of the leading enforcers. She blackmails Wonder Man into actively supporting S.H.I.E.L.D.'s crusade to hunt down the superheroes opposed to the Superhuman Registration Act. She sends Kree supersoldier Noh-Varr, already brainwashed, to capture the Runaways. She directs the Thunderbolts to capture Spider-Man; the two Thunderbolts members sent out, Jester and Jack O'Lantern, are slain by the Punisher. After foiling an attack on Stark Tower, Hill thinks that she does not want her job as director of S.H.I.E.L.D. and thinks she should not have been offered the position in the first place. She suggests that the only other person besides Nick Fury who should lead the organization is Stark himself. At the conclusion, the President appoints Tony Stark as the new director of S.H.I.E.L.D., with Hill (displeased) as acting deputy director.

Deputy Director 
After being made Deputy Director, Maria Hill becomes a core member of the S.H.I.E.L.D. cabinet and assists Stark in dealing with a sudden rise in various terrorist groups who have gained access to hyper-advanced biological weapons. Unlike the rest of the cabinet (including Sal Kennedy whom she loathed personally), Hill remains skeptical of a single conspiracy behind all these attacks. When the Mandarin's neoplastic tumor began infecting the Helicarrier, Hill organizes the evacuation; she (wrongly) believed the infection is the main objective of the attack. Subsequently, however, Hill becomes much more trusting in Stark's leadership, a trusted agent in her role as Deputy Director, and far less bound by conventional process, particularly after a confrontation with Dum Dum Dugan, in which she's forced to confront the fact that she was apparently willing to take actions that would allow innocent people to die while still sticking to "the book" because the alternative was to disobey orders. She eventually risks her career by locking down the United Nations under S.H.I.E.L.D. martial law so Stark can escape a tribunal and track down the Mandarin.

2008–2010 storylines 
During the 2008 "Secret Invasion" storyline, after the Helicarrier is disabled by Skrull invaders, Maria Hill, who is left in charge in Iron Man's absence, confronts a number of extraterrestrial Skrulls, shapeshifters who can assume the appearance of anyone or anything, who are revealed to have replaced Edwin Jarvis and a number of S.H.I.E.L.D. agents. The Skrulls execute Hill, but Hill is revealed to be a Life Model Decoy of Hill. Hill then activates the Helicarrier's self-destruct system, killing all the Skrull infiltrators on board, escaping via jet pack.

In the aftermath of the Skrull Invasion's failure, during the "Dark Reign" storyline, S.H.I.E.L.D is disbanded by the President, and Hill and Stark lose their jobs, replaced by the newly appointed director Norman Osborn who then reforms the fallen S.H.I.E.L.D. into H.A.M.M.E.R. In the Iron Man monthly series, Hill tries to go about having a normal life but Osborn dispatches H.A.M.M.E.R. to arrest her for theft. She joins her former boss as a fugitive after Iron Man stole the Superhuman Registration Database. The night before Tony leaves the two have a sexual tryst. Hill is sent on a mission by Tony to retrieve a hard drive. Hill finds the Controller holed up in the basement of Futurepharm, hooked into a large machine holding many people in containers. She barely manages to escape him, before downloading the data Tony sent her for. The skirmish with the Controller would leave her in a state of paranoia for a while. She then enlists the Black Widow to deliver the data to Captain America, all the while evading H.A.M.M.E.R. agents. However, they are captured when H.A.M.M.E.R. intercepts an e-mail from Stark. They are rescued by Pepper Potts, disguised as Madame Masque.

During the 2010 "Siege" storyline, Hill comes to the aid of Thor after Osborn launches an attack on Asgard. Hill becomes a supporting cast member in the Iron Man series, protecting him and his friends from multiple threats. In the 2010 "Heroic Age" storyline, which followed "Siege", Hill is appointed by Captain Steve Rogers to work with a new team of Avengers.

2010 to the present 
Following the apparent death of Fury, she was appointed commander, then acting director, and finally director of S.H.I.E.L.D. following Daisy Johnson's actions that involved the Secret Avengers invading A.I.M. Island.

During the "Avengers: Standoff!" storyline, Hill and S.H.I.E.L.D. have established Pleasant Hill, a super villain prison designed to resemble a gated community. While working at Pleasant Hill, Maria Hill operates as the Mayor of Pleasant Hills. A training video for the S.H.I.E.L.D. cadets working there showed that she and the S.H.I.E.L.D. scientists have used reality-warping technology derived from the Cosmic Cube called "Kobik" as a demonstration was used where Graviton is turned into a mild-mannered Pleasant Hill chef named Howie Howardson. When Commander Steve Rogers is brought before Maria Hill, he tells her of his knowledge that the Kobik project was not disposed of. Maria Hill presented the inhabitants of Pleasant Hill to Steve Rogers: she mentions that the citizens are reformed supervillains. When Steve Rogers demanded to know where were the fragments of Cosmic Cubes used for Kobik, she directed him to the eerie little girl who was the fragments of the Cosmic Cube that have taken the form of a near-omnipotent child.

Following the "Civil War II" storyline, Hill was later seen being kidnapped by Diablo, who attempted to extract the security code clearances for all the active helicarriers and the Triskelion, when she was rescued by Victor Von Doom.

Powers and abilities 
Maria Hill is an extremely effective commander, leader, tactician, and military strategist. She is a highly skilled martial artist and hand-to-hand fighter, as well as being a proficient marksman and armed combatant.

Reception

Accolades 

 In 2015, Entertainment Weekly ranked Maria Hill 37th in their "Let's rank every Avenger ever" list.
 In 2019, CBR.com ranked Maria Hill 2nd in their "10 Best S.H.I.E.L.D. Agents Of All Time" list.
 In 2020, Scary Mommy included Maria Hill in their "Looking For A Role Model? These 195+ Marvel Female Characters Are Truly Heroic" list.
 In 2020, CBR.com ranked Maria Hill 2nd in their "10 Best Directors To Lead S.H.I.E.L.D." list.
 In 2021, CBR.com ranked Maria Hill 4th in their "10 Best Agents Of S.H.I.E.L.D." list.
 In 2022, The A.V. Club ranked Maria Hill 83rd in their "100 best Marvel characters" list.

Other versions

MC2 
In the world of the MC2 universe, Maria Hill is a member of the National Security Force. When a government assignment went awry a piece of the Carnage symbiote was released. The Symbiote was stopped by Spider-Girl, the daughter of Spider-Man, as she later reported the success to that world's Nick Fury. She is later seen accusing American Dream of the A-Next, for crimes against the US, as the heroine stumbles upon a government mission.

Ultimate Marvel 
In the Ultimate Marvel universe, Maria Hill is an ex-S.H.I.E.L.D. Agent and a homicide detective currently working for the NYPD. She first appears while questioning Miles Morales about the death of Aaron Davis. This investigation led to the discovery that Spider-Man wasn't the killer as the press believed and that Davis had an accidental death when a weapon backfired. She is the one working on the Venom case that involved a home invasion into the Morales house and hurt his father. She notices that Gwen Stacy, Mary Jane Watson, Ganke Lee and Miles quickly went into his home. She illegally barges in, but is coy with the kids, only to be thwarted by Gwen's knowledge of law due to her deceased father, and Mary Jane recording her on her tablet. Maria definitely suspects Miles as Spider-Man. Suddenly, there is word that Venom is attacking the hospital where Miles father and mother are at. Maria yells at Miles telling him to save the citizens at the hospital. Miles scales the light post and buildings in front of Maria confirming that he is Spider-Man.

Old Woman Laura 
In a possible future, a scarred, cyborg Hill is head of the joint Chiefs of Staff under President Kamala Khan. She joins Laura Kinney on an attack on Latveria, where Doctor Doom reigns as the last active supervillain. When the group pass under the energy dome around the city, Maria's cybernetics shut down. Though she is still able to do her part by use of a special bullet hiding a miniaturized Wasp. During a battle against a horde of Doombots, one of the machines fires a laser blast that goes right through Laura and lethally wounds Maria.

In other media

Television 

 Maria Hill appears in Iron Man: Armored Adventures, voiced by Tabitha St. Germain.
 Maria Hill appears in The Avengers: Earth's Mightiest Heroes, voiced by Kari Wuhrer. This version is a central member of S.H.I.E.L.D. who becomes its director after Nick Fury's sudden disappearance.
 Maria Hill appears in Marvel Disk Wars: The Avengers, voiced by Akeno Watanabe in Japanese and Kari Wahlgren in English.
 Maria Hill makes non-speaking cameo appearances in Avengers Assemble.
 Maria Hill will appear in Moon Girl and Devil Dinosaur, voiced by Cobie Smulders.

Film 
 Maria Hill appears in Iron Man: Rise of Technovore, voiced by Junko Minagawa in the Japanese version and Kari Wahlgren in the English dub.
 Maria Hill appears in Avengers Confidential: Black Widow & Punisher, voiced again by Junko Minagawa in the Japanese version and Kari Wahlgren in the English dub.

Marvel Cinematic Universe 

Maria Hill appears in media set in the Marvel Cinematic Universe (MCU), portrayed by Cobie Smulders. This version is the deputy director of S.H.I.E.L.D. and Nick Fury's close friend and assistant.
 Hill is introduced in the live-action film The Avengers, where she assists Fury in building the titular group to defeat Loki and the Chitauri.
 Hill appears in the live-action TV series Agents of S.H.I.E.L.D. episodes "Pilot", "Nothing Personal", and "The Dirty Half Dozen".
 In the live-action film Captain America: The Winter Soldier, Hill assists Fury, Steve Rogers, Natasha Romanoff, and Sam Wilson in defeating Hydra sleeper agents inside S.H.I.E.L.D. Following the organization's dissolution, Hill begins working at Stark Industries. 
 In the live-action film Avengers: Age of Ultron, Hill assists the Avengers in defeating Hydra's remnants and Ultron before helping them build their new headquarters.
 In the live-action films Avengers: Infinity War and Avengers: Endgame, Hill falls victim to the Blip, but is restored to life five years later and attends Tony Stark's funeral.
 In the live-action film Spider-Man: Far From Home, the Skrull Soren impersonates Hill under Fury's orders.
 An alternate timeline version of Hill appears in the Disney+ animated series What If...? episode "What If... Thor Were an Only Child?", with Smulders reprising the role. After Fury is injured by Korg during Thor's party, Hill becomes the acting director of S.H.I.E.L.D., and calls Carol Danvers to assist them in stopping the party.
 Hill will return in the upcoming live-action Disney+ series Secret Invasion, with Smulders reprising her role once more.

Video games 
 Maria Hill appears as a non-player character (NPC) in Marvel: Ultimate Alliance 2, voiced by Margaret Easley.
 Maria Hill appears as an NPC in Marvel Avengers Alliance.
 Maria Hill appears in Marvel Heroes, voiced by Kari Wuhrer.
 Maria Hill appears as an unlockable playable character in Lego Marvel Super Heroes, voiced by Danielle Nicolet.
 Maria Hill appears as an unlockable playable character in Lego Marvel's Avengers, voiced again by Cobie Smulders.
 Maria Hill appears as an NPC in Marvel: Avengers Alliance Tactics.
 Maria Hill appears as a playable character in Marvel Puzzle Quest.
 Maria Hill appears in Iron Man VR, voiced by Ali Hillis. This version is the Deputy Director of S.H.I.E.L.D. and Nick Fury's right-hand woman who has a friendly relationship with Tony Stark.
 Maria Hill appears in Marvel's Avengers, voiced by Jennifer Hale. This version commands S.H.I.E.L.D.'s remnants following Nick Fury's disappearance and A.I.M. using the destruction of A-Day to take the Avengers' place in the world and acquire most of S.H.I.E.L.D.'s resources.
 Maria Hill appears in Marvel Snap.

Miscellaneous 
Maria Hill appears in Marvel Universe LIVE!.

See also 
 List of S.H.I.E.L.D. members

References

External links 
 Maria Hill at Marvel.com
 

Female characters in film
American female characters in television
Fictional characters from Chicago
Fictional women soldiers and warriors
Marvel Comics military personnel
Fictional military strategists
Fictional spymasters
Marvel Comics martial artists
Marvel Comics television characters
Marvel Comics female superheroes
Comics characters introduced in 2005
Characters created by Brian Michael Bendis
S.H.I.E.L.D. agents
Fictional female martial artists
Avengers (comics) characters
Fictional female secret agents and spies